Granite City High School is a public high school located in Granite City, Illinois. Granite City High School serves those living in Granite City, Madison, Pontoon Beach, and Mitchell.

History
Up until 1983, the city of Granite City, Illinois was served by two high schools; Granite City South and Granite City North. In 1983, the two high schools were merged to form Granite City High School, with Granite City South's building being used.

Athletics
Granite City High School athletics teams are independent and do not compete in a conference. Granite City's colors are red, black, and white and their mascot is the warrior. Granite city offers the following sports programs:

State championships 

 Boys' basketball
 1940 Illinois State Champions
 Boys' soccer
 1972 Illinois State Champions
 1976 Illinois State Champions
 1977 Illinois State Champions
 1978 Illinois State Champions
 1979 Illinois State Champions
 1980 Illinois State Champions
 1982 Illinois State Champions
 1987 Illinois State Champions
 1989 Illinois State Champions
 1990 Illinois State Champions
 Girls' soccer
 2011 3A Illinois State Champions

Notable alumni
Salty Parker, Major League Baseball infielder, coach, and manager
Dal Maxvill, Major League Baseball infielder
Kevin Greene, Hall of Fame NFL defensive end and linebacker.

References

External links

Public high schools in Illinois
Schools in Madison County, Illinois
1983 establishments in Illinois